Petra Ritter (née Wobst; born 1974) is a German neuroscientist and medical doctor at Charité in Berlin.   Her field is computational neuroscience and her focus is developing brain simulations for individual people with neurological conditions, combining EEG and neuroimaging data.

Ritter studied medicine at Humboldt University Berlin.   She did residencies at UCLA, UCSD, Mount Sinai School of Medicine in New York, and Harvard Medical School, as well as Charité.  In 2002, she received her medical license to practice medicine. In 2004, she completed her doctoral thesis at Charité under Arno Villringer.

She led a lab at Max Planck Institute for Human Cognitive and Brain Sciences in Leipzig from 2011 to 2015.

She is a cofounder of The Virtual Brain open-source brain simulation platform.  Since October 2017 she has held a lifetime BIH Johanna-Quandt Full Professorship of Brain Simulation at the Dept. of Neurology at the Charité and Berlin Institute of Health.

As of 2018, her most-cited papers were:

References

External links
 Vido Interview (German). Berlin Institute of Health. 27 November 2017 
 Lab website: 
 Former lab website at Max Planck Institute for Human Cognitive and Brain Sciences: 

1974 births
Living people
German women neuroscientists
German neuroscientists